John Shiban is an American television writer and producer. He worked in both capacities on The X-Files and its spin-off The Lone Gunmen, Star Trek: Enterprise, Smallville, Supernatural, Legend of the Seeker, Breaking Bad, and The Vampire Diaries. In 1997, he was nominated for a Primetime Emmy Award for Outstanding Writing for a Drama Series for his work on The X-Files episode "Memento Mori". He shared the nomination with co-writers Chris Carter, Frank Spotnitz, and Vince Gilligan. In 1998, Shiban shared a nomination for the Primetime Emmy Award for Outstanding Drama Series with The X-Files production team.

In 2009 Shiban reunited with Gilligan to work as a writer/producer on the second season of Gilligan's series Breaking Bad. Shiban was nominated for a Writers Guild of America Award for episodic drama for the episode "Phoenix" in 2010. Shiban and the writing staff also shared a nomination for the WGA award for best drama series for their work on the second season. Shiban returned as a consulting producer for the third season of Breaking Bad. He left the crew at the end of the third season.

In August 2010, Shiban was confirmed as a writer for Torchwood'''s fourth series Torchwood: Miracle Day.

In 2011, Shiban joined the series Hell on Wheels as executive producer and writer. In November 2012, the show's creators Joe and Tony Gayton decided to no longer be involved in the day to day production. Shiban was thought to be a good candidate to take over, however he stated that he would also be leaving the series. Since 2020, he has been writing and executive producing for the show Ozark''.

Credits

The X-Files

Breaking Bad

Torchwood: Miracle Day

Hell on Wheels

Better Call Saul

Shut Eye

NOS4A2

Ozark

References

External links
 

Living people
American television producers
American television writers
American male television writers
American television directors
Year of birth missing (living people)